Cherry Street Bridge may refer to:

 Cherry Street Strauss Trunnion Bascule Bridge, a bascule bridge and Warren truss in Toronto, Ontario, Canada
 Cherry Street lift bridge, a bascule lift bridge on Cherry Street, in Toronto, Ontario, Canada
 Cherry Street Bridge (Shell Rock, Iowa), U.S., listed on the National Register of Historic Places
 Martin Luther King Bridge (Toledo, Ohio), U.S., over the Maumee River
 Cherry Street Bridge (Mississippi), U.S., a Mississippi Landmark